Mickey Woolliams (born 27 March 1996) is a New Zealand rugby union player who currently plays for  Taranaki in the Bunnings Warehouse NPC. His preferred playing position is Lock.

References 

Living people
1996 births
Counties Manukau rugby union players
New Zealand rugby union players
Rugby union locks
Taranaki rugby union players
Rugby union players from Rotorua